Gabarus Lake is a community in the Canadian province of Nova Scotia, located in the Cape Breton Regional Municipality.

References
  Gabarus Lake on Destination Nova Scotia

Communities in the Cape Breton Regional Municipality
General Service Areas in Nova Scotia